Church of Jesus Christ may refer to:
Christian Church, the body of all persons that share faith based in Christianity
Church of Jesus Christ–Christian, a white-supremacist church founded by Ku Klux Klan organizer Wesley A. Swift
Church of Jesus Christ at Armageddon, commonly known as the Love Family, a communal church founded in 1968 by Love Israel
Church of Jesus Christ in Madagascar, the national church of Madagascar and the country's second-largest Christian denomination
Church of Jesus Christ, known as Harshmanites, a small pacifist church in Illinois with Methodist origins
A number of churches with a shared heritage in the Latter Day Saint movement:
Church of Christ (Latter Day Saints), the original Latter Day Saint church which for a short period of time was called "The Church of Jesus Christ"
The Church of Jesus Christ of Latter-day Saints (LDS Church) the largest denomination within the Latter Day Saint movement
Church of Jesus Christ (Cutlerite), a church consisting of a single branch in Independence, Missouri
Church of Jesus Christ (Drewite), a church founded in 1965 by Theron Drew as a schism from the Church of Jesus Christ of Latter Day Saints (Strangite)
Church of Jesus Christ (Original Doctrine) Inc., a Bountiful, British Columbia FLDS Church-offshoot based on the teachings of Winston Blackmore, who split with the FLDS Church after concluding that Warren Jeffs, had exceeded his authority and become too dictatorial.
Church of Jesus Christ (Zion's Branch), a Missouri church founded in 1986 by former members of the Reorganized Church of Jesus Christ of Latter Day Saints
Church of Jesus Christ of the Children of Zion, a short-lived denomination of Rigdonites, founded in 1845 and dissolved by 1847
Church of Jesus Christ Restored 1830, a church founded in the mid-1980s by dissenting members of the Reorganized Church of Jesus Christ of Latter Day Saints
Church of Jesus Christ, the Bride, the Lamb's Wife, a church founded in 1842 by George M. Hinkle and other excommunicated Latter Day Saints
Holy Church of Jesus Christ, a church founded in 1964 by Alexandre Caffiaux as a schism from the Church of Jesus Christ of Latter Day Saints (Strangite)
Primitive Church of Jesus Christ (Bickertonite), a church that was formed in 1914 by dissenters from the Church of Jesus Christ (Bickertonite)
Reorganized Church of Jesus Christ (Bickertonite), a church that was formed in 1907 by dissenters from the Church of Jesus Christ (Bickertonite)
Restoration Church of Jesus Christ (Gay Mormon Church), a church formed in 1985 by  Antonio A. Feliz and other LGBT Latter Day Saints
Restored Church of Jesus Christ, a church founded in 1980 by Eugene O. Walton and based in Independence, Missouri
The Church of Jesus Christ (Bickertonite), an international church headquartered in Monongahela, Pennsylvania
True Church of Jesus Christ (Cutlerite), a now-defunct Cutlerite sect that existed from 1853 to 1869, based in Clitherall, Minnesota.

See also
Church of Christ (disambiguation)